Viburnum farreri (syn. V. fragrans) is a species of flowering plant in the family Adoxaceae (formerly Caprifoliaceae), native to northern China. Its dark green leaves are bronze when young, turning brilliant shades of red-purple in autumn. V. farreri grows in moist but well-drained soil in sun or partial shade.

The Latin specific epithet farreri commemorates the English plant collector Reginald Farrer.

This plant has gained the Royal Horticultural Society's Award of Garden Merit.

References

farreri
Flora of China